Nontando Judith Nolutshungu is a South African politician and a Member of Parliament for the Economic Freedom Fighters (EFF).

Biography
Nolutshungu has a  bachelor of social science degree and a postgraduate diploma in transport studies from the University of Cape Town.

In 2013, she joined the Economic Freedom Fighters as an ordinary member. She entered the National Assembly on 23 January 2018 as a replacement for Moses Sipho Mbatha. Nolutshungu then became a member of the  Portfolio Committee on Higher Education and Training and the Portfolio Committee on Transport.

At the 2019 South African general election held on 8 May, Nolutshungu won a full term in parliament. She now only serves on the Portfolio Committee on  Transport.

In December 2019, Nolutshungu was elected to the EFF's Central Command Team, its highest decision-making structure.

References

External links
National Assembly profile

Living people
Year of birth missing (living people)
Place of birth missing (living people)
21st-century South African politicians
Members of the National Assembly of South Africa
Women members of the National Assembly of South Africa
Economic Freedom Fighters politicians